The UK Singles Chart is one of many music charts compiled by the Official Charts Company that calculates the best-selling singles of the week in the United Kingdom. Before 2004, the chart was only based on the sales of physical singles. This list shows singles that peaked in the top ten of the UK Singles Chart during 2003, as well as singles which peaked in 2002 and 2004 but were in the top ten in 2003. The entry date is when the song appeared in the top ten for the first time (week ending, as published by the Official Charts Company, which is six days after the chart is announced).

Two hundred and twenty-nine singles were in the top ten in 2003. Eleven singles from 2002 remained in the top ten for several weeks at the beginning of the year, while "Hey Ya!" by Outkast was released in 2003 but did not reach its peak until 2004. "Sk8er Boi" by Avril Lavigne" was the only song from 2002 to reach its peak in 2003. Sixty artists scored multiple entries in the top ten in 2003. 50 Cent, The Darkness, Good Charlotte, Sean Paul and The White Stripes were among the many artists who achieved their first UK charting top-ten single in 2003.

The 2002 Christmas number-one, "Sound of the Underground" by Girls Aloud (which was the group's winners single after being formed on Popstars: The Rivals), remained at number-one for the first three weeks of 2003. The first new number-one single of the year was "Stop Living the Lie" by Fame Academy winner David Sneddon. Overall, twenty-two different singles peaked at number-one in 2003, with Busted (2) having the most singles hit that position.

Background

Multiple entries
Two-hundred and twenty-nine singles charted in 2003, with two-hundred and eighteen singles reaching their peak this year.

Sixty artists scored multiple entries in the top ten in 2003. Jamaican singer Sean Paul achieved five top five entries in the United Kingdom, the most of any act that year, including the number-one single "Breathe", which he recorded with Blu Cantrell. His second highest charting song was "Baby Boy", a duet with Destiny's Child member Beyoncé as she launched her solo career, peaking at number two. Of his other hit singles, "Like Glue" charted highest at number three,"Get Busy" reached a high of number four and "Gimme the Light" landed one place lower but made the top five.

Six artists had the joint second most top ten singles in 2003 with four each. Busted, Girls Aloud, Christina Aguilera, Robbie Williams, The Cheeky Girls and Justin Timberlake all had four top-ten singles in 2003. Busted claimed the number-one spot on two occasions with "You Said No" and "Crashed the Wedding". A third single, "Year 3000" placed at number two and they achieved a fourth hit single for the year with "Sleeping with the Light On", reaching a high of number three. Girls Aloud took debut single "Sound of the Underground" - recorded as their winning single for the television competition show Popstars the Rivals - to number one at the end of the previous year, beating rival act One True Voice to Christmas number one. While One True Voice disbanded after one more single, Girls Aloud scored three more top tens in 2003 - both a cover of "Jump" for the Love Actually soundtrack and "No Good Advice" placed at number two, and "Life Got Cold" made number three.

Fellow Popstars contestants The Cheeky Girls followed up December 2002's launch single "The Cheeky Song (Touch My Bum)" (a number two hit) with three more top ten singles. "Take Your Shoes Off" went straight in at number three, as did "Hooray Hooray (It's a Cheeky Holiday)". A Christmas single, "Have a Cheeky Christmas" scraped into the top ten at the end of the year. Christina Aguilera had one of the biggest hits of her career with "Beautiful", which topped the chart in March 2003. "Fighter" was a number three entry, "Can't Hold Us Down", with the added vocals of Lil' Kim placed at number 6 and "The Voice Within" rounded off her year, peaking at number nine.

Justin Timberlake, who had previously been part of 'N Sync, had four top ten hits in his own right, including one featured appearance on The Black Eyed Peas single "Where Is the Love?". The song spent six weeks at number-one and was the best-selling single of 2003. His other chart hits were number-two peaking "Cry Me a River" and "Rock Your Body", and "Work It" with Nelly which made number seven.

Former Take That singer Robbie Williams was the final artist with four top-ten singles to his name in 2003. "Feel" officially charted at the end of 2002 but remained in the chart for the first couple of weeks of the year. "Something Beautiful" reached number three in August, "Come Undone" ranked one place lower and "Sexed Up" placed at number ten.

Rock band Evanescence was one of a number of artists with three top-ten entries, including the number one single "Bring Me to Life".50 Cent, Big Brovaz, Delta Goodrem, Good Charlotte and Westlife were among the other artists who had multiple top-ten entries in 2003.

Chart debuts
Eighty-five artists achieved their first top-ten single in 2003, either as a lead or featured artist. Of these, thirteen went on to record another hit single that year: Appleton, Amy Studt, The Black Eyed Peas, The Coral, The Darkness, David Sneddon, Electric Six, Fast Food Rockers, Jaimeson, Lemar, Richard X, t.A.T.u and Triple 8. Five artists achieved two more chart hits in 2003: 50 Cent, Delta Goodrem, D-Side, Evanescence and Good Charlotte. Sean Paul had four other entries in his breakthrough year.

The following table (collapsed on desktop site) does not include acts who had previously charted as part of a group and secured their first top-ten solo single. 

Notes
Richard X was a producer on Freak Like Me by Sugababes in 2002 but "Being Nobody" was his first official credit. Kym Marsh was part of the group Hear'Say, who had two number-one singles in 2001. "Cry" and "Come On Over" were her debut chart entries as a solo artist.

Lisa Scott-Lee launched her solo career with "Lately" in 2003. She was previously a member of the group Steps. Rachel Stevens achieved her first top ten hit outside S Club with "Sweet Dreams My LA Ex", which reached number two.

The comedy Christmas song "Proper Crimbo" was credited to Bo Selecta! but had various other artists on the recording and in the video. Among these were chart debutants including Dermot O'Leary, Edith Bowman, Jimmy Carr, Matthew Wright and Richard Bacon as well as musicians who already had a top-ten hit to their name. Melanie Blatt was in All Saints in the 1990s and made number six in 2001 as a solo artist with her feature on Artful Dodger's song "TwentyFourSeven". Melanie Brown had been a member of the internationally successful Spice Girls, while MC Harvey was part of So Solid Crew and Kerry Katona had been a founding member of Atomic Kitten. The broadcaster Jimmy Young had a series of chart hits in the 1950s, including number-ones "Unchained Melody" and "The Man from Laramie". David Gray's most widely known song to date was "Babylon", a number 5 entry in June 2000. Bob Geldof found fame as a member of The Boomtown Rats. Fame Academy winner David Sneddon had reached the top of the charts earlier in the year with debut single "Stop Living the Lie", and Australian soap actress and singer Holly Valance made her breakthrough in 2002 with "Kiss Kiss".

The Idols was made up of the final 10 from Pop Idol series 2. Michelle would have a number-one single with "All This Time" in January 2004, and Sam Nixon and Mark Rhodes formed the duo Sam and Mark.

Songs from films
Original songs from various films entered the top ten throughout the year. These included "03 Bonnie & Clyde" (from Hey Arnold: The Movie), "Love Ain't Gonna Wait for You" (Seeing Double), "Feel Good Time" (Charlie's Angels: Full Throttle), "Maybe Tomorrow" (Wicker Park), "Stuck" (Stuck in the Suburbs), "Shake Ya Tailfeather" (Bad Boys II), "Jump" and "Too Lost in You" (Love Actually) and "Mad World" (Donnie Darko).

Charity singles
A number of singles recorded for charity reached the top ten in the charts in 2003. The Comic Relief single was a cover version of Norman Greenbaum's "Spirit in the Sky" by Gareth Gates and The Kumars, peaking at number one on 22 March 2003.

Shane Richie recorded the Children in Need single for 2003, a cover of Wham!'s "I'm You're Man". It peaked at number two on 6 December 2003.

Best-selling singles
The Black Eyed Peas had the best-selling single of the year with "Where Is The Love?". The song spent eleven weeks in the top ten (including six weeks at number one), sold over 625,000 copies and was certified platinum by the BPI. "Spirit in the Sky" by Gareth Gates and The Kumars came in second place, selling more than 552,000 copies and losing out by around 70,000 sales. R. Kelly's "Ignition (Remix)", "Mad World" from Michael Andrews featuring Gary Jules and "Leave Right Now" by Will Young made up the top five. Singles by t.A.T.u., Ozzy & Kelly Osbourne, Blu Cantrell featuring Sean Paul, Room 5 featuring Oliver Cheatham and The Darkness were also in the top ten best-selling singles of the year.

Top-ten singles

Entries by artist

The following table shows artists who achieved two or more top-ten entries in 2003, including singles that reached their peak in 2002. The figures include both main artists and featured artists, while appearances on ensemble charity records are also counted for each artist. The total number of weeks an artist spent in the top ten in 2003 is also shown.

Notes

 "Dilemma" re-entered the top ten at number 10 on 11 January 2003 (week ending).
 Released as the official single for Comic Relief.
 "Born to Try" re-entered the top ten at number 10 on 12 April 2003 (week ending). It rose to number 9 again on 19 April 2003 (week ending).
 "Husan" was used in a television commercial for Peugeot in 2003.
 "Fly on the Wings of Love" re-entered the top ten at number 8 on 5 July 2003 (week ending), dropped out two weeks later, and re-entered for a second time on 26 July 2003 (week ending), rising to number 8 again on 2 August 2003 (week ending) and spending one more week in the top ten.
 "Are You Ready for Love" was used by Sky Sports to promote their coverage of Premiership football. It was first released in 1979 when it only charted at number 42.
 Justin Timberlake was not credited on the single cover of "Where Is The Love?" but he contributed vocals to the song.
 "Hey Ya" re-entered the top 10 on 17 January 2004 (week ending).
 Released as the official single for Children in Need.
 Figure includes appearances on Beyonce's "Baby Boy" and Blu Cantrell's "Breathe".
 Figure includes single that peaked in 2002.
 Figure includes appearances on The Black Eyed Peas' "Where Is the Love?" and Nelly's "Work It".
 Figure includes appearance on Jay-Z's "'03 Bonnie & Clyde".
 Figure includes appearance on Nelly's "Dilemma".
 Figure includes appearance on Britney Spears' "Me Against the Music".
 Figure includes single that first charted in 2002 but peaked in 2003.
 Figure includes appearance on Blue's "Sorry Seems to Be the Hardest Word".
 Figure includes appearance on Pharrell Williams' "Frontin'".
 Figure includes a top-ten hit with the group S Club.

See also
2003 in British music
List of number-one singles from the 2000s (UK)

References
General

Specific

External links
2003 singles chart archive at the Official Charts Company (click on relevant week)

2003 record charts
2003 in British music
2003